The River Seaton is a river in east Cornwall, England, UK which flows southwards for  into the English Channel.

The river rises near Caradon Hill and flows generally south past Darite, Menheniot and Hessenford and a few miles farther south into the sea at Seaton Beach, west of Downderry. The river has been dug into channels in its lower reaches which has sped the flow of the water up and straightened the curves out. Additionally, because of the mining history around Bodmin Moor, the water is polluted with traces of aluminium and copper; both these effects have led to smaller populations of wildlife inhabiting the river.

There is an early record of the river as "Seythyn" in 1302; the name means "little arrow river".

See also 

 Seaton Valley Countryside Park

References

External links

River Seaton; Explore Britain
Seaton; Cornwall Rivers Project

Seaton